The World Figure Skating Championships is an annual event sanctioned by the International Skating Union in which figure skaters compete for the title of World Champion.

The 1907 competition took place on January 21–22 in Vienna, Austria-Hungary.

Results

Men

Judges:
 Eduard Engelmann 
 Tibor von Földváry 
 H. Günther 
 Ludwig Niedermeyer 
 Alexej Pavlovich Lebedev

Ladies

Judges:
 E. v. Markus 
 E. S. Hirst 
 Ludwig Niedermeyer 
 E. Gschöpf 
 Eduard Engelmann

Sources
 Result List provided by the ISU

World Figure Skating Championships
World Figure Skating Championships, 1907
Figure skating in Austria-Hungary
International figure skating competitions hosted by Austria-Hungary
1907 in Austrian sport
1900s in Vienna
Sports competitions in Vienna
January 1907 sports events